Ivan Manuel Amorim dos Santos (born 22 September 1988) is a Portuguese professional footballer who plays for SC Maria da Fonte as a midfielder.

Club career
Born in Espinho, Santos made his Primeira Liga debut in 2007–08 with Boavista FC, and scored in his last appearance of the season, a 2–1 away loss against Sporting CP. In July 2008, he signed a three-year contract with S.L. Benfica, but was immediately loaned to Boavista, with the northern club now in the Segunda Liga for irregularities.

After appearing regularly for the Porto side, again relegated, Santos was loaned once more for the 2009–10 campaign, joining another team in the second division, newly-promoted A.D. Carregado. Shortly after, he dropped down to the third tier and moved, still on loan, to Atlético Clube de Portugal.

In 2010–11, Santos played with hometown's S.C. Espinho, scoring three goals for an eventual seventh-place finish in division three. For the following season he returned to the second tier, signing with U.D. Oliveirense and helping it reach the semi-finals of the Taça de Portugal for the first time ever.

References

External links

1988 births
Living people
People from Espinho, Portugal
Portuguese footballers
Association football midfielders
Primeira Liga players
Liga Portugal 2 players
Segunda Divisão players
Boavista F.C. players
S.L. Benfica footballers
Atlético Clube de Portugal players
S.C. Espinho players
U.D. Oliveirense players
F.C. Penafiel players
S.C. Freamunde players
Gondomar S.C. players
Portugal youth international footballers
Sportspeople from Aveiro District